Elative can refer to:

Elative case, a grammatical case in Finno-Ugric languages and others
Elative (gradation), an inflection used in Arabic for the comparative and the superlative
The absolutive superlative (a superlative used without any compared object, expressing an intense degree) in some languages, such as Latin